The enzyme phenylserine aldolase catalyzes the chemical reaction

L-threo-3-phenylserine  glycine + benzaldehyde

This enzyme belongs to the family of lyases, specifically the aldehyde-lyases, which cleave carbon-carbon bonds.  The systematic name of this enzyme class is L-threo-3-phenylserine benzaldehyde-lyase (glycine-forming). This enzyme is also called L-threo-3-phenylserine benzaldehyde-lyase.  It employs one cofactor, pyridoxal phosphate.

Structural studies

As of late 2007, only one structure has been solved for this class of enzymes, with the PDB accession code .

References

 

EC 4.1.2
Pyridoxal phosphate enzymes
Enzymes of known structure